Suresh Atalrai Keswani  is an Indian politician. He was a member of the Rajya Sabha , the upper house  of the Parliament of India 
representing Maharashtra as an independent candidate.

References

External links
Suresh Keswani Rajya Sabha Profile

1942 births
Rajya Sabha members from Maharashtra
Living people
People from Larkana District